The Vijay for Best Male Playback Singer is given by STAR Vijay as part of its annual Vijay Awards ceremony for Tamil  (Kollywood) films. The award was first given in 2007.

The list
Here is a list of the award winners and the films for which they won.

Nominations
2007 Krish - "June Ponal July Kaatru" (Unnale Unnale)
Balram - "Kaatrin Mozhi" (Mozhi)
Haricharan - "Arabu Naade" (Thottal Poo Malarum)
S. P. Balasubrahmanyam - "Yaaro" (Chennai 600028)
Udit Narayan - "Sahana" (Sivaji)
2008 Hariharan - "Nenjukkul Peidhidhum" (Vaaranam Aayiram)
Belly Raj - "Kanagal Irandal" (Subramaniapuram)
Krish - "Adiye Kolluthey" (Vaaranam Aayiram)
Naresh Iyer - "Mundhinam Parthene" (Vaaranam Aayiram)
2009 Karthik - "Hasili Fisili" (Aadhavan)
Harish Raghavendra - "Nenje Nenje" (Ayan)
Krish - "Oru Chinna Thamarai" (Vettaikaaran)
Vijay Prakash - "Om Sivoham" (Naan Kadavul)
Vijay Yesudas - "Nila Nee Vaanam" (Pokkisham)
2010 Vijay Prakash - "Hosanna" (Vinnaithaandi Varuvaayaa)
Karthik - "Usure Poguthey" (Raavanan)
Haricharan - "Thuli Thuli" (Paiyaa)
Roop Kumar Rathod - "Pookal Pookum" (Madrasapattinam)
Alphonse Joseph - "Aaromale" (Vinnaithaandi Varuvaayaa)
 2011 S. P. Balasubrahmanyam, S. P. B. Charan - "Ayyayo" (Aadukalam)
 Aalap Raju - "Enamo Aedho" (Ko)
 Haricharan - "Aariraro" (Deiva Thirumagal)
 Karthik - "Dhimu Dhimu" (Engeyum Kadhal)
 Velmurugan - "Otha Sollaala" (Aadukalam)
 2012 Mohit Chauhan - "Po Nee Po" (3)
 Dhanush - "Why This Kolaveri Di" (3)
 Gaana Bala - "Nadukadalula" (Attakathi)
 Haricharan - "Ayyayyo" (Kumki)
 Vijay Prakash - "Asku Laska" (Nanban)
 2013 Yuvan Shankar Raja - "Kadal Raasa" (Maryan)
A. R. Rahman - "Nenjae Ezhu" (Maryan)
Shankar Mahadevan, Kamal Haasan - "Unnai Kaanadhu Naan" (Vishwaroopam)
Sid Sriram - "Adiye" (Kadal)
Sriram Parthasarathy - "Aanandha Yaazhai" (Thanga Meenkal)
 2014 Pradeep Kumar - "Agayam Theepiditha" (Madras)
Abhay Jodhpurkar - "Vinmeen" (Thegidi)
Haricharan - "Sandi Kuthirai" (Kaaviya Thalaivan)
V. V. Prasanna - "Koodamela Koodavechi" (Rummy)
Vishal Dadlani - "Aathi" (Kaththi)

See also
 Tamil cinema
 Cinema of India

References

Male Playback Singer